Vadamarachchi ( Vaṭamarāṭci) is one of the three historic regions of the Jaffna peninsula in northern Sri Lanka. The other two regions are Thenmarachchi and Valikamam. Alternative spellings include Vadamarachi, Vadamaraachi or Vadamaraadchi.

Etymology
Vadamarachchi translates to "possession of northerners" or "rule of the northerners" in English. It is derived from the Tamil words vadamar (northerners) and achchi (possession or rule).

See also
 Thenmarachchi
 Valikamam

References

 
Geography of Jaffna District